Rootare is a surname of Estonian origin and may refer to:

Hillar Rootare (1928–2008),an Estonian-born American physical chemist.
Salme Rootare (1913–1987), an Estonian chess master.
Vidrik Rootare (1906–1981), an Estonian chess player.

Other uses
Rootare–Prenzlow equation, an equation named after Hillar Rootare and Carl Prenzlow that formulated a means to calculate cumulative surface areas of porous solids based on data taken in mercury porosimetry testing. 

Estonian-language surnames